North Main Street Historic District in Canandaigua, New York is a historic district that was listed on the NRHP in 1973.

Significant buildings are the First Congregational Church, the 1812 built courthouse which was city hall by 1972, and a dozen Federal and Greek Revival architecture houses.

The First Congregational Church in the district was covered in a HABS survey. In 1984, it was incorporated into the Canandaigua Historic District.

Gallery

References

External links

 First Congregational Church, North Main Street, Canandaigua, Ontario County, NY: 10 photos, 16 measured drawings, and 3 data pages, at Historic American Buildings Survey
 Gideon Granger House, 295 North Main Street, Canandaigua, Ontario County, NY: 8 photos, 17 measured drawings, and 3 data pages, at Historic American Buildings Survey

Federal architecture in New York (state)
Greek Revival architecture in New York (state)
Historic districts in Ontario County, New York
Historic districts on the National Register of Historic Places in New York (state)
National Register of Historic Places in Ontario County, New York